The ITV Tomahawk is a French single-place, paraglider that was designed by Xavier Demoury and produced by ITV Parapentes of Épagny, Haute-Savoie. It was introduced in 2003, but is now out of production.

Design and development
The Tomahawk was designed as an intermediate glider. The models are each named for their approximate wing area in square metres.

Variants
Tomahawk 25
Small-sized model for lighter pilots. The glider model is CEN Standard certified.
Tomahawk 28
Mid-sized model for medium-weight pilots. The glider model is CEN Standard certified.
Tomahawk 31
Large-sized model for heavier pilots. The glider model is CEN Standard certified.

Specifications (Tomahawk 28)

References

Tomahawk
Paragliders